Raymond Dolan may refer to:

Raymond Joseph Dolan (born 1954), Irish neuroscientist
Raymond Paul Dolan (born 1957), American engineer

See also
Ray Dolan, Irish singer-songwriter and guitarist